Oko Town is the third album of Swiss folk rock and indie rock band 77 Bombay Street released 5 October 2012 after their self-financed independent album Dead Bird in 2009 and their studio album Up in the Sky in 2011. It was released on Gadget Records.

The single "Low on Air" was released on 17 August 2012 and the follow-up singles were "Angel" and "Follow the Rain".

The album reached the top of the Schweizer Hitparade, the official Swiss Albums Chart becoming their first chart topping release in Switzerland. The album was certified platinum.

Track listing

Charts

Weekly charts

Year-end charts

References

2012 albums
77 Bombay Street albums